Öçal is a Turkish surname. Notable people with the surname include:

  (born 1959), Turkish musician
 Özgür Öçal (born 1981), Turkish footballer

Turkish-language surnames